Householder Franchise or census suffrage is where a homeowner has the right to vote in an election. This is a limited form of suffrage, but different from equal voting because, to borrow a dictum, householder franchise is one Household, one vote because it entitles only the householder one vote.

History 
The 1832 Reform Act expanded the number of voters in the United Kingdom. In the boroughs the right of voting was vested in all householders paying a yearly rental of £10 and, subject to one year residence qualification £10 lodgers (if they were sharing a house and the landlord was not in occupation).

In the counties, the franchise was granted to:
 40 shilling freeholders
 £10 copyholders
 £50 tenants
 £10 long lease holders
 £50 medium lease holders
Borough freeholders could vote in the counties if their freehold was between 40 shillings and £10, or if it was over £10 and occupied by a tenant.

References 

Elections